Hinjili is a Vidhan Sabha constituency of Ganjam district, Odisha

Area of this constituency includes Hinjilicut, Hinjilicut block and Sheragada block.

Elected Members

15 elections held during 1957 to 2019. List of members elected from Hinjili constituency are:

Election results

2019 result

2014 result
In 2014 election, Biju Janata Dal candidate Naveen Patnaik defeated Indian National Congress candidate Sibaram Patra by 76,586 votes.

2009 result
In 2009 election, Biju Janata Dal candidate Naveen Patnaik defeated Indian National Congress candidate Raghab Parida by 61,273 votes.

Notes

References

Politics of Ganjam district
Assembly constituencies of Odisha